Montaldo may refer to:

Places in Piedmont, Italy
 Montaldo Bormida a commune in the Province of Alessandria
 Montaldo di Mondovì a commune in the Province of Cuneo
 Montaldo Roero a commune in the Province of Cuneo
 Montaldo Scarampi a commune in the Province of Asti
 Montaldo Torinese a commune in the Province of Turin
 Montaldo, a locality of the commune of Cerrina Monferrato in the Province of Alessandria
 Montaldo, a locality of the commune of Spigno Monferrato in the Province of Alessandria
 Montaldo Cosola, a locality of the commune of Cabella Ligure in the Province of Alessandria

People
 Giuliano Montaldo (born 1930), Italian film director

See also
 Montaldeo, a commune in the Province of Alessandria, Piedmont
 Montalto (disambiguation)